Beckers Corners is a hamlet, in the town of Bethlehem, in Albany County, in the U.S. state of New York.

History
A post office Beckers Corners was in operation from 1873 until 1900. The community was named after the local Becker family.

References

Hamlets in Albany County, New York